The Neon Genesis Evangelion franchise has spawned a number of tie-in video games. Characters from the series have also made numerous appearances in other titles, such as the Super Robot Wars series by Banpresto.

PC and console games
The following are Evangelion video games that have been released on home and portable consoles, and computer OS.

Pachinko games 
The following is a list of Evangelion video games that are replications of existing Pachinko slot machines for home console devices. English titles are as provided on the game covers.

Mobile games 
The following are Evangelion games which have been released for mobile devices.

References 

 
Neon Genesis Evangelion games
Video games